Michael Thomas Lansing (born April 3, 1968) is a former Major League Baseball second baseman who played for the Montreal Expos, Colorado Rockies, and the Boston Red Sox between 1993 and 2001. During his playing days, he had the nickname “The Laser.”

Amateur career 
Lansing attended Wichita State University, and in 1988 he played collegiate summer baseball with the Harwich Mariners of the Cape Cod Baseball League. Utilizing a never-before-used rule, Lansing was drafted late in the 6th round of the 1990 MLB Draft by the Miami Miracle, an independent minor league team. Lansing played two seasons with the Miracle before making the major league with the Expos in 1993.

Professional career 
Lansing made his major league debut in the lineup early on in 1993 as a second baseman. In one of his first games, Lansing had five hits in a win over the Rockies.

In 1999, Lansing accompanied Denver Police on a fatal SWAT raid that killed Ismail Mena. The team was at the wrong address.

In 2001, while playing with Boston, Lansing made a fine catch for the 2nd to last out helping to preserve Hideo Nomo's no-hitter vs. the Baltimore Orioles.

Lansing had his best season in 1996, finishing with a .285 batting average and 183 hits in 159 games. Lansing also had 40 doubles that season, placing 6th.

In 1997 Lansing had another strong season, with career bests in home runs, 20, and RBIs, 70. On May 7, 1997, in a game against the San Francisco Giants, Lansing became the first National League second baseman since Bobby Lowe in 1894 to homer twice in the same inning. Lansing also became the third Expo to do so. After the '97 season, Lansing was traded to the Colorado Rockies for a couple of minor leaguers.

Lansing had a couple of disappointing seasons with the Rockies as injuries took their toll. Then, on June 18, 2000, in a game against the Arizona Diamondbacks, Lansing hit for the cycle faster than any player in MLB history, completing it by the fourth inning in a 19–2 win. A little more than a month later, Lansing, along with a couple of pitchers, were traded by the Rockies to the Boston Red Sox. He played a couple of mediocre seasons with the Red Sox before being released into free agency after the 2001 season. Lansing was signed as a free agent by the Cleveland Indians, but played in the minors and suffered a back injury before retiring after the 2002 season.

Mike Lansing Field, the stadium that is the home field of the Casper Horseheads of Independence League Baseball, is named for Lansing.

Mitchell Report
On December 13, 2007 former senator George Mitchell released his report to the commissioner of Major League Baseball concerning the use of illegal steroids and performance-enhancing drugs in baseball.  The following is an excerpt of the report referring to Lansing.

"According to [Kirk] Radomski, he was introduced to Lansing by David Segui while Segui and Lansing played together with the Expos. Radomski recalled that he engaged in four to five “small transactions” with Lansing. Radomski said that Lansing was familiar with testosterone and “knew exactly what he wanted.” Radomski produced two $1,000 money orders from Lansing, retrieved from his bank, made payable to Radomski; both were dated February 5, 2002... Radomski stated that this payment was for testosterone and one kit of human growth hormone. During the search of Radomski’s residence, an undated, partial shipping label was seized with Lansing’s name on it and a Colorado address. We have confirmed that Lansing resided at this address when he played with the Rockies. Lansing’s name, with an address and two telephone numbers, is listed in the address book seized from Radomski’s residence by federal agents."

See also
 List of Major League Baseball players to hit for the cycle
 List of Major League Baseball players named in the Mitchell Report

References

External links

1968 births
Living people
American expatriate baseball players in Canada
Baseball coaches from Wyoming
Baseball players from Wyoming
Boston Red Sox players
Buffalo Bisons (minor league) players
Colorado Rockies players
Harrisburg Senators players
Harwich Mariners players
Major League Baseball second basemen
Major League Baseball shortstops
Major League Baseball third basemen
Miami Miracle players
Minor league baseball coaches
Montreal Expos players
People from Rawlins, Wyoming
Wichita State Shockers baseball players
Anchorage Bucs players